Samuel Vickery VC (6 February 1873 – 20 June 1952) was a British recipient of the Victoria Cross, the highest and most prestigious award for gallantry in the face of the enemy that can be awarded to British and Commonwealth forces.

VC details
Vickery was 24 years old, and a private in the 1st Battalion, The Dorsetshire Regiment, British Army during the Tirah Campaign in British India when the following deed took place for which he was awarded the VC.

On 20 October 1897 during the attack on the Dargai Heights, Tirah, Private Vickery ran down the slope and rescued a wounded comrade under heavy fire, bringing him back to cover. He subsequently distinguished himself in the Waran Valley, killing three of the enemy who attacked him when he was separated from his company.

Further information
He fought in the Second Boer War and World War I and achieved the rank of corporal.

The medal
His Victoria Cross is displayed at The Keep Military Museum, Dorchester, Dorset, England.

References

Monuments to Courage (David Harvey, 1999)
The Register of the Victoria Cross (This England, 1997)

External links
Location of grave and VC medal (Mid Glamorgan, Wales)

1873 births
1952 deaths
Dorset Regiment soldiers
British recipients of the Victoria Cross
British military personnel of the Tirah campaign
People from South Somerset (district)
British Army personnel of the Second Boer War
British Army personnel of World War I
British Army recipients of the Victoria Cross
Military personnel from Somerset